Norwegian Cruise Line (NCL), also known in short as Norwegian, is an American cruise line founded in 1966, incorporated in Bermuda and headquartered in Miami. It is the fourth-largest cruise line in the world by passengers, controlling about 8.6% of the total worldwide share of the cruise market by passengers . It is wholly owned by parent company Norwegian Cruise Line Holdings.

History 

The cruise line was founded in 1966 by Norwegian Knut Kloster and Israeli Ted Arison, with the 8,666-ton, 140 m long cruise ship/car ferry, which in 1966 operated as a car ferry between Southampton UK and Gibraltar, for that one short season only. The Sunward was first managed under the Arison Shipping Company, and marketed as Ensign Cruises. Arison soon left to form Carnival Cruise Lines, while Kloster acquired additional ships for Caribbean service, with the line renamed and marketed as Norwegian Caribbean Line.

Norwegian Caribbean Line 
Norwegian pioneered many firsts in the cruise industry, such as the first out island, Great Stirrup Cay in the Bahamas, the first combined air-sea program (marketed as "Cloud 9 Cruises"), which combined low-cost air fares with the cruise, and first shipline to develop new ports in the Caribbean, such as Ocho Rios in Jamaica.

First Newbuilds 
Like the original Sunward of 1966, they had the capability to carry automobiles through a well-concealed stern door. Later, this area was turned into cabins and a two-deck movie theater, later to be used as a casino. Norwegian was responsible for many of the cruise innovations that have now become standard throughout the industry.

Norwegian would order two additional ships, that would be their first true cruise ships without any car carrying capacity. This would be the Southward in 1971, and an intended identical sister the Seaward, that would never be delivered to the line, and would be completed for P&O Cruises instead. The line would sell its original ship the Sunward in 1973, being too small in inadequate for the modern cruise market. They would purchase the former Cunard Adventurer in 1977, refitting her with the trademark NCL funnels, and renamed Sunward II.

The SS Norway 

Norwegian made headlines with the acquisition of the liner  in 1979, rebuilding the liner as a cruise ship and renaming her ''Norway''  The conversion cost more than US$100million. Her success paved the way for a new era of giant cruise ships.

Fleet New-builds & Acquisitions 

With an aging, small ship fleet by the late 1980s compared to the larger modern ships being built for competitors Carnival and Royal Caribbean, Norwegian attempted to catch up with an order of a new ship in 1987, the new Seaward, the lines first new build since 1971. Kloster would acquire Royal Cruise Line in 1989–90, and would eventually transfer the Westward to their fleet. Norwegian would also continue with further orders of new ships in the early 1990s, not trying to compete with the large size cruise ship building trend of competitors, but with the smaller with the Dreamward and Windward to offer better flexibility with itineraries.

The line would continue to acquire second hand ships in the mid-1990s, with the addition of the Leeward in 1995. In 1996 the Crown Odyssey which was part of NCL's subsidy line Royal Cruise Line, was transferred and became the Norwegian Crown. In 1997 Norwegian acquired Majesty Cruise Line, and would add their two ships, which became the Norwegian Majesty and Norwegian Dynasty. During this time Norwegian would rename all its ships with the "Norwegian" prefix (excluding the SS Norway), and change its livery for the second time to a dark blue funnel with gold NCL logo.

Norwegian has expanded to other parts of the world, including Alaska, Europe, Bermuda, and Hawaii. Between 1997 and 2001, the company also operated cruises out of Australia under the name Norwegian Capricorn Line and acquired Orient Lines in 1998.

Acquisition by Star Cruises & Freestyle Cruising 
Norwegian was sold by Kloster to Star Cruises in 2000, a subsidiary of Genting Hong Kong, part of the Malaysia-based Genting Group. Under the new ownership a new concept was introduced with the newly completed ship, Norwegian Sky, freestyle cruising. This concept freed passengers from fixed formal dining times, instead there was relaxed attire, several distinct dining options, relaxed disembarkation and more lounges, bars, theatres and other entertainment and activity options, a change that would have a ripple effect across the cruise industry.

Fleet Modernization 

With the financial backing of Star Cruises, the struggling Norwegian Cruise Line was able to begin to replace much of its older and second hand fleet with new ships. In addition to the Norwegian Sun, Star Cruises had ships already on order for their own fleet at Meyer Werft, which would be transferred to Norwegian during construction, with the first two debuting as the Norwegian Star in 2001 and Norwegian Dawn in 2002. These would be followed by an accelerated new build program, adding four more new ships over a five-year period.

NCL America 
In 2002, Norwegian purchased the half-complete hull of the first Project America ship, at the time under construction at Ingalls Shipbuilding in Pascagoula, Mississippi, US, which was towed to Germany to be completed at the Lloyd Werft shipyard. Subsequently, Norwegian acquired the rights to move two ships built entirely outside the United States under the US flag, making it possible to start a US-flagged operation under the brand name NCL America. In their July 2007 fiscal report, Norwegian noted the sale of the Independence, renamed SS Oceanic some time before. On July 1, 2010, the SS United States Conservancy struck a deal to buy the SS United States for $3 million. On February 1, 2011, the ownership was officially transferred to the SS United States Conservancy.

Departure of the SS Norway 
A boiler explosion in May 2003 forced Norwegian to withdraw the Norway from service, later being laid up in Bremerhaven, Germany, until 2005, when she was towed to Port Klang Malaysia with the claimed intent to use her as an anchored casino or slow overnight casino cruises on her remaining boilers. On September 11, 2007, the India Supreme Court issued an order permitting her to be broken up at Alang, despite the presence of large amounts of hazardous asbestos remaining on board.

Apollo Management and reorganisation 
In August 2007, Star Cruises sold 50% of Norwegian for $1 billion to US-based Apollo Management to strengthen Norwegian's financial position. In 2007, Star Cruises sold Orient Line's Marco Polo to Transocean Tours, and Orient Lines ceased operations in early 2008.

Following an initial public offering and corporate reorganisation in 2013, Norwegian was made a wholly owned subsidiary of Norwegian Cruise Line Holdings (NCLH), while Norwegian's previous owners Genting Hong Kong, Apollo Management and TPG Capital exchanged their stakes in Norwegian for shares in the newly listed NCLH.

Further New Builds and fleet Changes 
Norwegian reported in February 2008 that the Pride of Aloha, one of the two remaining NCL America ships, would be withdrawn from service in May of the same year. Initial reports suggested she would be transferred to the fleet of Star Cruises, but it was later announced that she would return to the Norwegian international fleet as the Norwegian Sky, while the Norwegian Majesty and Norwegian Dream would be sold to Louis Cruise Lines.

Norwegian Epic 
Two ships in this Epic class were ordered by NCL in November 2006, with an option for a third vessel that was not exercised. A dispute between NCL and STX initially resulted in the construction of both ships being placed on hold until a new agreement was reached. The agreement called for completion of the first ship; the second ship was cancelled in 2008. The sole remaining ship, Norwegian Epic, was delivered to NCL on 17 June 2010.

Breakaway Class 
On October 17, 2012, Meyer Werft and Norwegian reached a second agreement for the construction of two new vessels, slated for delivery in October 2015 and 2017, respectively. The project was under the code name "Breakaway Plus Class", with the vessels expected to be 163,000 gross tons and hold 4,200 passengers. The Norwegian Escape entered service in November 2015 and weighs 164,600 tons. Two more vessels were ordered on July 14, 2014, and they will enter service in 2018 and 2019 and will be slightly bigger at 164,000 GT.

The sale of the Norwegian Dream was subsequently cancelled. The Norwegian Dream became the Superstar Gemini for Star Cruises, from January 2013.

On June 1, 2012, Norwegian announced the signing of a memorandum of agreement to exercise its option to purchase Norwegian Sky. The purchase price was roughly $260 million, financing being provided by the seller.

In December 2016,  Norwegian Cruise Line announced it had reached an agreement with the Cuban government. In May 2017, the Norwegian Sky was the first Norwegian Cruise Line vessel to ever visit Cuba. The Norwegian Sky makes weekly trips from Miami to Havana, making Norwegian the only line sailing that route weekly.

On May 2, 2017, Norwegian Cruise Line announced a new PortMiami Terminal. The construction began on May 1, 2018, and is scheduled for completion by fall 2019. Between 2022 and 2025, Fincantieri intends to deliver four ships and in July 2018, the company announced an order for two more Project Leonardo ships. They are expected to enter service in 2026 and 2027. In December 2018, Norwegian revealed plans to build a new pier in Alaska's Icy Strait Point.

COVID-19 pandemic
In March 2020, the Miami New Times reported that managers at Norwegian had prepared a set of responses intended to convince customers wary of the ongoing COVID-19 pandemic to book cruises, including "blatantly false" claims that the coronavirus "can only survive in cold temperatures, so the Caribbean is a fantastic choice for your next cruise", that "[s]cientists and medical professionals have confirmed that the warm weather of the spring will be the end of the [c]oronavirus", and that the virus "cannot live in the amazingly warm and tropical temperatures that your cruise will be sailing to."

On March 14, 2020, the U.S. Centers for Disease Control and Prevention (CDC) issued a No Sail Order for cruise ships.  Concurrently Norwegian Cruise Line Holdings implemented a suspension of all cruise voyages across its three brands (Norwegian Cruise Line, Oceania Cruises, and Regent Seven Seas Cruises), with all 28 ships in port or at anchor and all passengers disembarked by March 28, 2020.  This suspension has subsequently been extended through June 30, 2020.

On May 5, 2020, in a filing with the Securities and Exchange Commission, Norwegian Cruise Line Holdings (NCLH) said there is “substantial doubt” about its ability to continue as a “going concern” as it faces a liquidity crisis over the next twelve months.

By the next day, NCLH was able to secure over $2.2 billion of additional liquidity in oversubscribed capital markets transactions, but at a price: (1) $400 million in common stock at $11 per share; (2) $675 million in senior secured notes due 2024 at a 12.25% interest rate; (3) $750 million in exchangeable notes due 2024 at 6% interest rate, and exchangeable at any time into common shares at $13.75; and (4) $400 million private investment from a global private equity firm. On May 7, 2020, NCLH CEO declared that the company has secured enough liquidity to get through potentially 18 months of zero revenues and may resume cruising later in 2020.

In anticipation of sailing again, Norwegian is implementing new health and safety measures, including installing H13 HEPA air filters. The company is also working with the CDC and the new color-coding system to indicate each ship's COVID-19 status, and to repatriate Norwegian crews still stuck aboard their vessel.

Even though the company lost $4 billion and furloughed 20 percent of its staff, it doubled the salary of its chief executive, Frank Del Rio, to $36.4 million.

Fleet 
, Norwegian Cruise Line operates 18 cruise ships, with five on order. It has also previously owned or operated 19 other ships. All its ships are flagged to the Bahamas, except for the Pride of America, which operates cruises within the United States and is flagged and registered in the US, as well as being owned by a US-registered subsidiary, NCL America.

Current ships

Future ships

Previous Ships

Ships which never entered service for NCL 
Ships which NCL had options on using but never took up for various reasons.

Private islands 

Norwegian owns two private islands in the Caribbean: Harvest Caye in Belize and Great Stirrup Cay in the Bahamas.

Subsidiary Cruise Lines 
Norwegian Cruise Line subsidiary lines over the years:

 Royal Viking Line (1984-1994)
 Royal Cruise Line (1989-1996)
 Norwegian Capricorn Line (1997-2001) 
 Orient Lines (1998-2008)
 Oceania Cruises (2014–present)
 Regent Seven Seas Cruises (2014–present)

References

External links 

 Official website
 Cruise Critic NCL review
 Website for NCLH investor information

 
1966 establishments in Norway
Companies based in Miami-Dade County, Florida
Cruise lines
Private equity portfolio companies
Shipping companies of Norway
Shipping companies of the United States